Up 'n' Under is a 1998 film adaptation of the John Godber play of the same name.

John Godber scripted and made his directorial debut with this adaptation of his play. The film was shot in Cardiff, Wales. It stars Gary Olsen, Richard Ridings, Samantha Janus, Ralph Brown, and Neil Morrissey.

Plot
Up 'n' Under follows the story of an inept pub team from the 'Wheatsheaf Arms' in a rugby league sevens competition in Kingston upon Hull in England. Ex-pro Arthur's only passions in life are his wife and rugby league. When he hears about the 'Cobblers Arms' pub team and their corrupt manager, Arthur bets his life savings with Reg Welch that he can train any team to beat them.

However, the 'Wheatsheaf Arms' can only muster a side of five whose pride lies in their unbroken record of defeat. The pitifully unfit set of men have to accept the help of a coach, who just happens to be a woman. Hazel solidifies their resolve and raises questions of their character.

They have to struggle through adversity, come up triumphant and become a team. They are given a bye to the final of the competition where they have to play The Cobblers.

Cast and characters
 Gary Olsen – Arthur
 Richard Ridings – Frank
 Samantha Janus – Hazel
 Ralph Brown – Phil
 Neil Morrissey – Steve
 Adrian Hood – Tommy
 David MacCreedy – Tony
 Tony Slattery – Reg Welch
 Brian Glover – Jack
 Griff Rhys Jones – Ray Mason
 Jane Clifford–Thornton – Doreen
 Susan Tully – June
 John Thomson – Stan
 Ystradgynlais Rugby Club 2nd team - Opposition teams

Reception
The film grossed £3.2 million ($5.4 million) in the UK.

References

External links
 
 

1998 films
British sports comedy films
Films set in Yorkshire
Films set in the 20th century
Television shows based on plays
Rugby league films
1998 directorial debut films
1990s English-language films
1990s British films